Joe Rowe may refer to:
Joe Rowe (American football) (born 1973), American football player
Joe Rowe (Australian footballer) (1901–1968), Australian rules football player